The Peru Central School District is the public school district of Peru, New York. The district is an independent public entity. The district operates two schools: Peru Elementary School, and Peru Junior/Senior High School. The campus also houses the ADK P-TECH program.

References

External links 
 

School districts in New York (state)
Education in Clinton County, New York